Lucy A. Mallory (Rose;  1843 or 1856September 4, 1920) was an American writer, publisher, editor, and spiritualist. She was also a "suffragist, vegetarian, and devotee of metaphysical experiences". Leo Tolstoy was so influenced by Mallory's magazine, the monthly spiritualist, The World's Advance Thought, that he called her the "greatest woman in America". Mallory was editor and publisher of The World's Advance Thought and the Universal Republic — two periodicals printed under one cover — published for more than thirty years. She died in 1920.

Early life
Lucy A. Rose was born  1843 in Michigan and grew up in Roseburg, Oregon. Her father, Aaron Rose, settled in Oregon early in the 1840s, and the city of Roseburg was named for him. He was one of the first European settlers at a time when the country was an unbroken wilderness. Her mother, Minerva Kellogg Rose, died in giving birth to Lucy. Mallory was reared among Native Americans.

Career
On June 24, 1860, she married Rufus Mallory, who afterwards represented Oregon in Congress, and who was later one of the most successful lawyers in the Pacific Northwest, and was the senior member of the extensive law firm to which Senator Joseph N. Dolph belonged. She accompanied her husband to Washington, D.C., after which they returned to Salem, Oregon.

In 1874, the old slavery prejudice was so strong in Oregon that some forty-five African American and mulatto children were prevented from attending the Salem public schools and kept from all chance of acquiring an education, as no Caucasian teachers would condescend to teach them. A public fund was set apart for them, but no one came forward to labor for it. Mallory volunteered to instruct the children, in the face of sneers and ridicule. Her course shamed the people into a sense of duty, and within three years, friction and opposition ended, and the children were admitted into the public schools and classes. Mallory, having no immediate use for the public money which she drew for her work, let it remain in the bank.

In 1886, she used the fund for the purchase of a printing plant, and soon after, started her monthly magazine, the World's Advanced Thought, with Judge Horatio N. Maguire for assistant editor. After Maguire retired from editorial connection, on account of the pressure of other business affairs, he still contributed to its pages, while Mallory, who was always the proprietor, had full control. Her magazine circulated among advanced thinkers and workers. Tolstoy subscribed to it.

Mallory established and maintained the first free reading room in Portland. For thirty years, it was open to all who would enter it. In it were many rare books of spiritualism and philosophy, as well as periodicals, not easily obtainable elsewhere. Mallory, with her All World Soul Communion hour, to be observed around the world, was the pioneer in the "going into the Silence" idea, collectively. Many New Thought groups have since practised this method of attaining unity of thought. In addition to her reading room and periodicals, Mallory kept parlors open for meetings held twice or three times a week. Often these were addressed by speakers of world reputation, but oftener, those with unusual ideas spoke there as the one place in the city where they could utter their thoughts in a friendly and hospitable atmosphere. Many tried their speaking powers here for the first time. Elizabeth Towne, publisher of Nautilus Magazine, Holyoke, Massachusetts, was one of these. Prince & Schaffer (2017) described Mallory as an "anarchist creative" with her cultural club, the Association of Artists and Authors. Mallory was always a vegetarian.

Mallory was a Life Member of the National American Woman Suffrage Association. In the early 1900s, the Oregon Vegetarian Society held meetings in the "Advance Thought" parlor at the Hotel Mallory, the parlor being owned by Mallory.

Personal life

Her work, like that of her husband, was in Portland, but their home was on their ranch or fruit farm,  out in the suburbs of the city. She had two children, Elmer Ellsworth (1862–1918), and Lulu (1872-1872), who died after 13 days. Mallory died in 1920, at age 76, in San Jose, California.

Notes

References

Works cited

Further reading
 Mrs. L. A. Mallory is Struck by Train, The Oregonian, April 8, 1919.

External links

 
 
 

19th-century births
1920 deaths
19th-century American educators
19th-century American women writers
19th-century American writers
19th-century American women educators
American magazine editors
American spiritualists
American suffragists
American vegetarianism activists
American women non-fiction writers
Educators from Oregon
People from Roseburg, Oregon
Wikipedia articles incorporating text from A Woman of the Century
Women magazine editors
Writers from Oregon